FPE may refer to:

 Factor price equalization
 Fire protection engineer
 Flash pulmonary edema
 Floating-point exception
 Format-preserving encryption
 Force Protection Europe, a vehicle manufacturer
 Fokker–Planck equation
 Free-piston engine
 Fuchs Petrolub, a German lubricant manufacturer
 Fuel Price Escalator, a British fuel duty
 Pichinglis, an English creole spoken in Equatorial Guinea